Magne Aarøen (April 28, 1944 in Innvik – June 27, 2003) was a Norwegian politician for the Christian People's Party (KrF). He was elected to the Norwegian Parliament from Sogn og Fjordane in 2001.

He previously served as a deputy representative from 1981 to 1985 and 1993–1997, and was the mayor of Selje from 1981 to 1983.

Parliamentary Committees 
2001 - 2003 member of the Standing Committee on Social Affairs.

External links

1944 births
2003 deaths
Christian Democratic Party (Norway) politicians
Mayors of places in Sogn og Fjordane
Members of the Storting
21st-century Norwegian politicians